Vahidli (also, Vaitly and Vayytly) is a village and municipality in the Tovuz Rayon of Azerbaijan.  It has a population of 1,074.

References 

Populated places in Tovuz District